Keng-Suu may refer to the following villages in Kyrgyzstan:

 Keng-Suu, Tüp
 another name for Tölök, Kochkor District, Naryn Region
 Keng-Suu, Jumgal